The President's Man is a 2000 American made-for-television action film starring Chuck Norris and Dylan Neal. A sequel, The President's Man: A Line in the Sand was made in 2002. It was first shown on CBS on April 2, 2000.

Plot 
Joshua McCord (Norris) is thinking about retiring from his grueling job as a Secret Service agent who is assigned to protect the President (Waite). But first, he must save the First Lady (Adams), kidnapped by a mysterious band of terrorists. To help him on the mission, McCord prepares to train his replacement. Along this path he notices Deke Slater (Neal) previously an Army sergeant with a temper.

Cast 

 Chuck Norris as Agent Joshua McCord
 Dylan Neal as Sergeant Deke Slater
 Jennifer Tung as Agent Que McCord
 Ralph Waite as President Matthews 
 Marla Adams as First Lady Matthews
 Stuart Whitman as George Williams
 Soon-Tek Oh as General Vinh Tran
 Jonathan Nichols as Don Diego Santiago
 Ariel Chipman as Terry Anderson
 Greg Ricks as Dr. Francis Anderson
 Ken Farmer as The Judge
 Mark Dalton as Delta Force Soldier

Production

Filming
The filming of The President's Man took place from the November 30, 1999 to March 21, 2000, entirely Dallas (Texas) and Camp Hoblitzelle Midlothian TX, with a budget of 2,000,000 U.S. dollars.

Release

Television and home media 
On April 2, 2000, the television-film had its American premiere on CBS. Months after it was released on DVD in other countries including France, England and Argentina. In Italy it was released in the first TV in 2001.

Sequel 

A sequel titled The President's Man: A Line in the Sand, first aired on CBS in 2002.

See also
 List of American films of 2000
 Chuck Norris filmography

External links

References 

2000 television films
2000 films
2000 action films
American action television films
CBS network films
2000s English-language films